Sango: The Legendary African King is a 1997 epic Nigerian film, written by Wale Ogunyemi, produced and directed by Obafemi Lasode. The film depicts the life and reign of the legendary fifteenth century African king Sango, who ruled as the Alaafin of Oyo and became an important deity of the Yoruba people.

Cast
Wale Adebayo as Sango
Peter Fatomilola as Babalawo Oyo (Oyo herbalist) 
Racheal Oniga as Obba
Joe Layode as Elempe
Bukky Ogunnote as Osun (often pronounced Oshun)
Gbenga Richards as Samu
Laide Adewale as Agbaakin
Professor Ayo Akinwale as Bashorun
Antar Laniyan as Olowu
Ola Tehinse as Balogun
Jimi Solanke as Ghost
Albert Aka-eze as Eliri
Toyin Oshinaike as Oluode 
Peter Fatomilola as Babalawo Oyo
Wale Ogunyemi as Lagunan
Kola Oyewo as High Chief
Kayode Odumosu as Tamodu
Doyin Hassan as Omiran
Mufu Hamzat as Biri
Jumoke Oke-eze as Chantress
Florence Richards as Otun Iyalode and *Remi Abiola as Iyalode

Screening
In 1998, the film was screened by the Film Society of Lincoln Center, New York City, U.S.A. as part of the 4th New York African Film Festival. In February 1999, the film was screened at the 7th Pan African Film Festival in Los Angeles. In April 2002, the film was selected to open the Minneapolis–Saint Paul International Film Festival.

Awards
Best Feature Film at the 1st Abuja International Film Festival, held in Abuja, Nigeria, in October, 2004
Best First Film of a Director at the Nigerian Film Festival held in Lagos, November, 2003.

References

1997 films
Nigerian epic films
Epic films based on actual events
Nigerian drama films
Films about religion
Nigerian films based on actual events
Yoruba-language films
English-language Nigerian films